Labyrinthoceras is an extinct cephalopod genus included in the ammonoid family Sphaeroceratidae, a member of the superfamily Stephanoceratoidea, that lived during middle of the Jurassic Period.

Labtrinthoceras is described as large, round-whorled with an open umbilicus; body chamber smooth with a terminal constriction. The chambered phragmocone is finely ribbed. Coiling is eccentric, a character of the family.

References

 W.J Arkell et al. 1957. Mesozoic Ammonoidea. Treatise on Invertebrate Paleontology, Part L. Geological Society of America and University of Kansas Press.

Jurassic ammonites
Bajocian life
Fossil taxa described in 1919
Ammonitida genera
Stephanoceratoidea